Shahriar Pourdanesh (born July 19, 1970) is a former American football offensive lineman who played in the National Football League for the Washington Redskins, Pittsburgh Steelers, and Oakland Raiders from 1996 to 2001 when in 2001 a severe knee injury cut his career short. He is distinguished as being the first Iranian to play in the National Football League.

Early years
Pourdanesh is a graduate of University High School in Irvine, California.

An All-American and All Conference selection, and two time team captain for the University of Nevada at Reno, where in 1992 he was awarded Nevada's Most Outstanding Offensive Player award.  He was an  integral part and leader of one of the nation's top offenses during that span, and helped lead the Wolfpack to three conference titles and a spot in the 1990 1AA National Title game.  He was inducted into the Nevada athletic Hall of Fame in 2005.

Professional career
He previously played with the Baltimore Stallions of the Canadian Football League from 1994–1995, where he was an All-Star and won the CFL's Most Outstanding Offensive Lineman Award in 1994 (the first ever rookie to be honored so), and was a member of the Grey Cup Championship team in 1995.  He was also signed to a one-year deal with the Cleveland Browns in 1993 under coach Bill Belichick.  He played for the Washington Redskins before being traded to Pittsburgh in August 1999 for a conditional seventh-round selection in the 2000 draft. He is the only Iranian-born football player in NFL history and has over 80 professional starts in his career.

Personal life
Shar and his family escaped revolution in 1979 and fled to Europe.  The Pourdanesh family settled in Irvine, California in 1983 after spending 3 years in West Germany.  He was introduced to football at age 15.

References

1970 births
Living people
American football offensive tackles
Baltimore Stallions players
Iranian emigrants to the United States
Nevada Wolf Pack football players
Oakland Raiders players
Sportspeople from Irvine, California
Sportspeople from Tehran
Sportspeople of Iranian descent
Pittsburgh Steelers players
Washington Redskins players